Cornelis Pieter Eecen (17 June 1898 – 25 December 1988) was a Dutch rower. He competed in the men's eight event at the 1924 Summer Olympics.

References

External links
 

1898 births
1988 deaths
Dutch male rowers
Olympic rowers of the Netherlands
Rowers at the 1924 Summer Olympics
Sportspeople from North Holland